Draria is a district in Algiers Province, Algeria. It was named after its capital, Draria.

Municipalities
The district is further divided into 5 municipalities:
Draria
Baba Hecène
Douéra
Khraïcia
El Achour

Notable people

Districts of Algiers Province